Orthops campestris is a species of plant bugs belonging to the family Miridae, subfamily Mirinae, that can be found everywhere in Europe except for Azores, Faroe Islands, Iceland and African islands such as Canary Islands and Cyprus.<ref>{{cite web|url= http://www.faunaeur.org/full_results.php?id=452078|archive-url= https://web.archive.org/web/20131014173025/http://www.faunaeur.org/full_results.php?id=452078|url-status= dead|archive-date= October 14, 2013|title=Orthops (Orthops) campestris (Linnaeus, 1758)|publisher=Fauna Europaea|version=2.6.2|date=August 29, 2013|accessdate=October 14, 2013}}</ref> and across the Palearctic to Central Asia and Siberia.

Description and ecology
They feed on wild parsnip, Angelica,  Heracleum , Aegopodium, Daucus , Anthriscus,  Pimpinella, Anethum, and in gardens on Levisticum officinale''. Adults overwinter after which they mate in spring. The new generation starts in July.

References

Bugs described in 1758
Taxa named by Carl Linnaeus
Hemiptera of Europe
Mirini